The men's sabre was one of ten fencing events on the fencing at the 1996 Summer Olympics programme. It was the twenty-third appearance of the event. The competition was held on July 21, 1996. 43 fencers from 20 nations competed. Nations had been limited to three fencers each since 1928. The event was won by Stanislav Pozdnyakov, prevailing over silver medalist Sergey Sharikov in an all-Russia final. The medals were the first for Russia as an independent nation, separate from the Soviet Union, in the men's sabre. Damien Touya of France won the bronze medal bout, extending France's podium streak to four Games.

Background
This was the 23rd appearance of the event, which is the only fencing event to have been held at every Summer Olympics. Two of the quarterfinalists from 1992 returned: gold medalist Bence Szabó of Hungary and fifth-place finisher Antonio García of Spain. Grigory Kiriyenko of Russia had won two world championships (1989 and 1991) before the 1992 Games but suffered an early exit; he had won two more world championships (1993 and 1995) since then and hoped for better success in Atlanta. His teammates, Stanislav Pozdnyakov and Sergey Sharikov, also came into the tournament among the top five seeds. Germany's Felix Becker was also a world champion (1994).

Algeria, Azerbaijan, Georgia, and Ukraine each made their debut in the men's sabre; Russia competed separately from the other Soviet republics for the first time since 1912. Italy made its 21st appearance in the event, most of any nation, having missed the inaugural 1896 event and the 1904 Games.

Competition format

The 1996 tournament vastly simplified the competition format after a horrendously complex system used in the previous Games in Barcelona. Pool play was eliminated. Double elimination was eliminated. The tournament became a simple single-elimination bracket, with a bronze medal match. Bouts were to 15 touches. Standard sabre rules regarding target area, striking, and priority were used.

Schedule

All times are Eastern Daylight Time (UTC-4)

Results

Section 1

Section 2

Section 3

Section 4

Finals

Final classification

References

Fencing at the 1996 Summer Olympics
Men's events at the 1996 Summer Olympics